SP-A may refer to:
 Socialistische Partij Anders, the Socialist Party of Flanders, Belgium
 Surfactant protein A